"Whine Up" is the debut single by American singer Kat DeLuna, released from her debut album, 9 Lives. The song features Elephant Man. It was believed that Puerto Rican rapper Ivy Queen was featured, but DeLuna herself provided the rap. The song earned DeLuna a Billboard Latin Music Award for "Latin Dance Club Play Track Of The Year." The title comes from the Caribbean English (West Indian) pronunciation of wind up meaning to move one's hips on the dance floor.

Music video
DeLuna had asked fans that live in the New York City area to send in a video of them dancing on her song so they might win the opportunity to be featured in the music video for the song.

The video (directed by Gil Green) premiered via her MySpace page. It starts with DeLuna singing the introduction of Dulcissime, from Carl Orff's Carmina Burana for her friend, when she is suddenly interrupted by the tune of her song, at which point she performs the song and dances. The song is accompanied by her dance, The Whine Up.
The video premiered on MTV's TRL on July 26, 2007 and was on the countdown for 31 days, peaking at #2. The video features future Dance Central choreographer Marcos Aguirre who later choreographed the same song as DLC for its sequel.

Chart performance
The song was released to mainstream radio in the United States on May 15, 2007. The song debuted at number 24 on Billboard'''s Bubbling Under Hot 100 Singles chart and went on to peak at number 29 on the Hot 100. The song has had over 500,000 legal downloads in the U.S. and was certified Gold on February 13, 2008. "Whine Up" peaked at number nine on the French charts.

Promotions and performances
DeLuna performed "Whine Up", alongside two back-up dancers, at the Miss Teen USA 2007 pageant which aired August 24, 2007 on NBC. Her performance accompanied the top 15 swimsuit competition.

DeLuna recorded a version of "Whine Up" for the 2007 New York Mets and performed this version at Shea Stadium, home field for the Mets.

Other song performances and versions
The song was used as the theme music for WWE's SummerSlam 2007 pay-per-view wrestling event.

The song has been featured in or associated with two films: It was featured in the trailer for the film Feel the Noise (2007) starring Omarion, and was included on the soundtrack for the direct-to-video film Bring it On: Fight to the Finish (2009).

Actor/U.S. Army Iraq War Veteran J.R. Martinez and professional dancer Karina Smirnoff, winners of the 13th U.S. version of Dancing with the Stars'', received a perfect score (30/30) for their freestyle dance that was set to "Whine Up". Their choreography was centered around Afro-Cuban reggaeton rhythms and associated with dance moves.

Track listing and formats

French CD single
 English Album Version 3:25
 Johnny Vicious Club Drama Mix 7:30

French CD promo single
 Whine Up 3:25

German CD maxi-single
 English Album Version 3:25
 Johnny Vicious Club Drama Mix 7:30

German enhanced CD maxi-single
 Whine Up 3:25
 Vicious Radio Mix 3:21
 Johnny Vicious Club Drama Mix 7:30
 Video

Australian CD maxi-single
 Whine Up 3:25
 Vicious Radio Mix 3:21
 Johnny Vicious Club Drama Mix 7:30
 Video

U.S. CD ringle
 Album Version 3:25
 En Español 3:25
 Johnny Vicious Mix Show 5:13

U.S. CD maxi-single
 En Español 3:25
 English Version 3:25
 Bilingual Version 3:25

U.S. CD promo maxi-single
 Whine Up 3:22

U.S. CD promo single (remixes)
 Party Club Drama 4:26
 Party Mixshow Drama 5:31
 Warehouse Mix Acid Dub 4:21
 Club Mix Spanish Vocals 4:26
 Party Radio 3:18
 Radio Mix Spanish Vocals 3:18

U.S. EP
 Johnny Vicious Club Drama Mix 7:30 
 Johnny Vicious Mix Show 5:34 
 Johnny Vicious Warehouse Acid Dub Mix 7:26 
 Album Version 3:25 
 Johnny Vicious Spanish Mix 3:17

Release history

Charts

Weekly charts

Year-end charts

Certifications

See also
 Number-one dance hits of 2007 (USA)
 Phonological history of wh

References

External links
 video

Kat DeLuna songs
2007 debut singles
Music videos directed by Gil Green
Elephant Man (musician) songs
Song recordings produced by RedOne
Songs written by RedOne
Songs written by Kat DeLuna
2007 songs
Epic Records singles